Tod Williams may refer to:

Tod Williams (architect) (born 1943), architect
Tod Williams (filmmaker) (born 1968), film director (and son of the architect)

See also
Todd Williams (disambiguation)